South Lodge Camp is an archaeological site of the Bronze Age, situated about  south-east of the village of Tollard Royal, in Wiltshire, England. The site is on Cranborne Chase, near the boundary with Dorset. It is a scheduled monument.

Description
The site is in Berwick St John parish, on a gentle west-facing slope above a dry valley. There is a Martin Down style enclosure (named after the enclosure at Martin Down, also on Cranborne Chase), and a cemetery of six round barrows nearby at Barrow Pleck.

Excavations
Augustus Pitt Rivers, inheritor of the Rushmore Estate, where he was resident from 1880, investigated many prehistoric monuments on his estate. He excavated the site at South Lodge: the barrow cemetery from 1880 to 1883, and the enclosure in 1893. He reconstructed the enclosure and barrows after excavation, and in the barrows he erected concrete plinths marking the location of cremations. The Salisbury Museum has a Bronze Age clay urn, found by Pitt Rivers in the ditch around the enclosure.

There was re-excavation from 1977 to 1981 by John Barrett, Richard Bradley and Martin Green. Two round timber buildings, and a mound of burnt flint thought to be a cooking area, were found inside the enclosure. Hollows, thought by Pitt Rivers to be natural, were identified as pits for storing grain.

Barrow cemetery and lynchets
The barrow cemetery originally consisted of six barrows, one of which had been destroyed before Pitt Rivers started his excavation. There were at least 24 cremations, placed in pits beneath the mounds. Three barrows were partially re-excavated in 1978.

As a result of the 1977–1981 excavation, it is thought that the field system developed after the cemetery was created; the cemetery was in use over a long period, continuing after the enclosure was built. The site was occupied, according to radiocarbon dating, from about 1250 BC to 1050 BC.

Pitt Rivers excavations
Other archaeological sites on Cranborne Chase excavated by Pitt Rivers include the Martin Down Enclosure, Rotherley Down Settlement, Woodcutts Settlement and Wor Barrow.

References

Scheduled monuments in Wiltshire
Archaeological sites in Wiltshire
Bronze Age sites in Wiltshire